Air Commodore Ian Horrocks (died 10 June 2014) was a Royal Air Force helicopter pilot, a senior Royal Air Force officer in the 1970s and 1980s and a Commandant Royal Observer Corps. Horrocks was the Station Commander of RAF Shawbury from 1978 to 1980.

Horrocks retired as an air commodore. He died on 10 June 2014.

References

|-

Royal Air Force officers
People of the Royal Observer Corps
Helicopter pilots
2014 deaths
Year of birth missing